Gelechia aspoecki is a moth of the family Gelechiidae. It is found in southern France.

References

Moths described in 1992
Gelechia